This is a list of the governors of the province of Herat, Afghanistan.

Governors of Herat Province

See also
 List of current governors of Afghanistan

Notes

Governors of Herat Province
Herat